Radical Something is an independent trio composed of Alex Lagemann (Loggy), Josh Hallbauer (Josh Cocktail), and Michael Costanzo (Big Red). According to Billboard.com the trio "blends hip-hop and rock with a decidedly Californian vibe". Their newest offering, a 7-song EP entitled "Hot Sauce" was released independently on November 4, 2016.

Career

2011: Formation & We Are Nothing 
Lagemann and Costanzo met while attending UC Berkeley as football teammates. Lagemann began his music careers recording hip-hop songs in his college apartment; Costanzo was a DJ.</ref> In February 2011, Costanzo met Josh Hallbauer at a New York City recording studio. In their first session together, they wrote the song "Be Easy" (Feat. Kinetics), and uploaded an acoustic video of the record to Costanzo's YouTube page. The video was seen by photographer, Bruce Weber, who immediately hired the trio to act in and produce a short soundtrack for his short, "Don't Steal The Jacket"—a 24 minute film for Moncler Jacket's 2012 Winter campaign. When filming wrapped Costanzo, and Hallbauer chose to cancel their flights home in favor of recording more songs together. The trio spent 2 weeks at a home studio in Boca Raton, Florida, finishing 7 songs, and ultimately deciding to form the band, Radical Something.

The newly formed group finished 8 more songs in the following months, and released their debut album "We Are Nothing" on September 20, 2011. Led by singles "Be Easy", "California", "Escape" and "Long Hair Don't Care", We Are Nothing, was downloaded over 50,000 times and reached #9 on the iTunes Alternative Albums chart.

2012: No Sweat & Summer of Rad
On February 26, 2012, Radical Something released their second project No Sweat, a six song EP. No Sweat reached #6 on the iTunes overall album chart and #33 on the Billboard Independent Albums chart. In Spring 2012, Radical Something's first national headlining tour brought the trio to 25 major cities and college towns in the US. Following the No Sweat Tour, the band had supporting performances for Slightly Stoopid, Capital Cities Asher Roth and SOJA.

In Summer 2012, Radical Something announced "The Summer Of Rad", a weekly release series spanning 13 weeks from June through August. The Summer Of Rad was deemed a viral success garnering over 500,000 song downloads and millions of online streams.

2013: Ride It Out 
On May 5, 2013 they released "We Were Just Kids", the lead single from their upcoming album Ride It Out entering the top 100 on iTunes Alternative single charts and reaching #1 on the Twitter Music Emerging Artist Chart, holding this position for a full week.

Ride It Out, was released on September 2, 2013 debuting at #3 on the iTunes Alternative Album Charts.

In support of the album, the group took their Ride It Out Tour to 30 U.S. cities. The tour featured opening acts Outasight and Down With Webster. In September they then joined Timeflies and Sammy Adams on the Warning Signs Tour for 8 concerts across Arizona, Texas, Georgia, Florida, and North Carolina.

2014: North American Tours and "Cali Get Down"
The Spring of 2014 saw the group support the EDM act Krewella and hip-hop artist Logic on the Verge Campus tour, which spanned 25 college shows across America. On July 22 the band announced via their Facebook page that they would be joining Matisyahu as direct support on a 50 city North American tour which would run from September 14 through November 14 and reach 30 US States and Canada. On July 28 they released their newest single, "Cali Get Down", which was co-produced by David Kahne and Goodwill & MGI. The music video was released later that week via YouTube.

Radical Something's concert in St.Petersburg, Florida has been uploaded to YouTube later. A live album named after its venue, Jannus Live, was released, shortly after.

2015: Summer of Rad 2015 
Radical Something brought back their Summer of Rad concept from 2012, with 10 songs released over the course of 10 weeks. The first song, "Down South," was released on June 29.

2016: Hot Sauce
On November 4 Radical Something released their 7-song EP "Hot Sauce". It was preceded by the singles "Paradise In You" and "One Soul".

Members
 Josh Hallbauer – lead vocals (2011–present)
 Mike Costanzo  – bass, guitar, keyboard, percussion, backing vocals (2011–present)
 Alex Lagemann  – rap vocals, guitar(2011–present)
Alex Lagemann is a Director at Cushman& Wakefield, https://www.linkedin.com/in/alex-lagemann-3509848b

Discography

Albums 
 We Are Nothing (2011)

 Ride It Out (2013)

 Jannus Live (2015 Live Album)

EPs
 No Sweat (2012)

 Hot Sauce (2016)

Compilations
 The Summer of Rad (2012)
 Sky Is Born
 All These Times
 Lemonade
 Start Livin'
 Tomorrow
 Santa Barbara
 Letter To Our Friends
 Spread Your Wings
 Step Right Up
 Tequilla Kiss
 Hang Out
 Cutty Spot
 Naked In Venice
 Take a Hit (2012)
 California
 Be Easy ft. Kinetics
 Say Yes
 Waterfalls 
 Lookin' for Love
 Sun Down
 Acid Rain
 Escape
 Vibe To This
 Long Hair Don't Care
 Wash Away
 You Feel Amazing
 California (Demo)
 Freedom (Demo)
 Long Hair Don't Care (Demo)
 Summer Of Rad 2.0 (2015)
 Down South
 World Of Mine
 Tropical
 Superhero
 California, Pt. 2
 T-Shirt
 Cool Me Down
 Better Off ft. Matisyahu
 Can't Stop Now
 Paradise In You

Music videos

References

External links
 Official YouTube page

American musical trios
Indie rock musical groups from California
2011 establishments in California
Reggae fusion groups
Musical groups established in 2011